Mehdi Beneddine (born 26 February 1996) is a French professional footballer who plays as a defender for Algerian Ligue Professionnelle 1 club USM Alger.

Club career

Monaco
Beneddine made his debut for the Monaco B team aged 17 in a match against Mont-de-Marsan on 24 May 2014, coming on for Morgan Kamin in the 83rd minute. He went on to make 49 appearances for the Monaco reserve team.

Loan to Cercle Brugge
On 1 January 2017, Beneddine joined Belgian side Cercle Brugge on a six-month loan until 30 June 2017. Over one month later on 26 February, he made his debut in a 3–1 away win against Tubize, playing the full 90 minutes.

Quevilly-Rouen
On 27 June 2018, Beneddine signed a contract with Quevilly-Rouen.

USM Alger
In 2020, Beneddine signed a contract with Algerian club USM Alger.

Loan to Châteauroux
On 30 December 2021, Beneddine joined Châteauroux on a six-month loan until 30 June 2022.

Personal life 
Born in France, Beneddine is of Algerian descent. He holds both French and Algerian citizenship.

References

External links
 

Living people
1996 births
Footballers from Nîmes
Association football defenders
French footballers
French sportspeople of Algerian descent
French expatriate sportspeople in Monaco
AS Monaco FC players
Cercle Brugge K.S.V. players
US Quevilly-Rouen Métropole players
USM Alger players
LB Châteauroux players
Championnat National 2 players
Challenger Pro League players
Championnat National players
Championnat National 3 players
Algerian Ligue Professionnelle 1 players
French expatriate footballers
Expatriate footballers in Belgium
French expatriate sportspeople in Belgium